Martin Tielli is a Canadian singer-songwriter. He was a member of the Rheostatics, and has also released material as a solo artist and with the side project Nick Buzz. As well, he has appeared as a guest musician on albums by Barenaked Ladies, Kevin Hearn, The Waltons, Jane Siberry, Ashley MacIsaac, Meryn Cadell and Mia Sheard. He is also a painter, and created most of the album covers for the Rheostatics.

Tielli's siblings include brothers Doug Tielli and John Tielli and sister Sara Tielli. The brothers were members of the band People From Earth. Martin co-produced People From Earth's 1997 album, Luvskull, with the band and Don Kerr.

Career
In 1992, Tielli, along with Jonathan Goldsmith, Hugh Marsh and Rob Piltch, provided backup for a track on the album Back to the Garden; these four later formed the band Nick Buzz and produced two albums and an EP.

In 2001 Tielli released his first solo album, We Didn't Even Suspect That He Was The Poppy Salesman.

Rheostatics

Film
Tielli appears in the 2005 film, Black Widow, with Mary Margaret O'Hara and Sarah Slean, which was produced by CBC Television. Tielli took part in a 2009 interactive documentary series entitled City Sonic. The episode in which he appeared, directed by Peter Lynch, featured fellow Toronto artist, Laura Barrett, speaking of her first concert experience, which was seeing the Rheostatics perform Music Inspired by the Group of Seven at the Art Gallery of Ontario. Tielli and Barrett perform the song "Northern Wish" together. Tielli also wrote and performed a sizable portion of the soundtrack for Payback, a 2012 documentary film based on the book, Payback: Debt and the Shadow Side of Wealth, by Margaret Atwood.

Solo discography
 We Didn't Even Suspect That He Was the Poppy Salesman (2001)
 Operation Infinite Joy (2003)
 The Ghost of Danny Gross (2009)

With Nick Buzz
 Circo (1995, re-release 2002)
 Arnold Schoenberg and the Berlin Cabaret (2003)
 A Quiet Evening at Home (2013)

Compilation inclusions
 Kick at the Darkness (1991), "A Long Time Love Song" (with Jane Siberry)
 Back to the Garden (1992), "River" (with Hugh Marsh, Jonathan Goldsmith and Rob Piltch)
 More Large Than Earth (We Will Warn the Stars) (2005), "Our Keepers"
 Live in Toronto (2006), "If You Go Away (Ne Me Quitte Pas)", "Modest Lover (Der Genugsame Liebehaber)" and "Gigerlette" (with Art of Time Ensemble)
 Tielli sang the lead vocal on the opening track, "The Prisoner" from Ryan Granville-Martin's album Mouthparts and Wings (2013) which features a different vocalist on each song. The song also features a guitar solo by Kurt Swinghammer.

Equipment
Instruments 
 Encore arch-top electric guitar
 Fender 8-string pedal steel guitar
 Ibanez double-necked 6/12-string electric guitar
 Steinberger GP-2T electric guitar
 Takamine CP-132S classical guitar

Effects
 Alesis Quadraverb
 Boss CH-1 chorus with EQ
 Boss CS-2 Compressor
 Boss GE-7 Equalizer
 Boss OC-2 Octaver
 DOD FX25 envelope filter
 Ernie Ball volume pedal
 PSK DD 2000 digital delay
 Pro Co Rat distortion
 Roland On/Off switch

Tielli painted his Ibanez guitar with a "never quite presented idea" for the new Canadian flag, designed by A.Y. Jackson. This design is often mistaken for one originally championed by Prime Minister Lester B. Pearson to be the Canadian flag (nicknamed "the Pearson Pennant"). This guitar appears on the cover for the Rheostatics album, Double Live. Tielli's Steinberger guitar is nicknamed "Steiny".

Citations

References

External links
 
 

Living people
Canadian male singers
Canadian rock guitarists
Canadian male guitarists
Canadian rock singers
Canadian singer-songwriters
Italian emigrants to Canada
Musicians from Toronto
Canadian indie rock musicians
People from Etobicoke
Six Shooter Records artists
Rheostatics members
Year of birth missing (living people)
Canadian male singer-songwriters